Zhao Yingcheng (Hebrew name: מֹשֶׁה בֶּן־אַבְרָהָם, Moshe ben Avraham; Traditional Chinese: 趙映乘; born 1619, died after 1663) was a Chinese philosopher and politician during the Ming dynasty. He and his brother Zhao Yingdou, also a mandarin, held important government posts in the 1660s.

Life and career
Proficient in both Hebrew and Chinese, Zhao, from the province of Henan, obtained the jinshi degree in 1646. He was named director of the Ministry of Justice. Four years later he was sent to Fujian and Huguang as an official. He was remembered as an efficient administrator and excellent Confucian scholar who exterminated local bandits and founded schools.

In 1642, near the end of the Ming Dynasty, Kaifeng was flooded by the Ming army with water from the Yellow River to prevent the peasant rebel Li Zicheng from taking over. After this disaster, the city was abandoned. The synagogue of the Kaifeng Jewish community (reportedly dating from 1163) was destroyed, and the Jews took refuge on the north side of the Yellow River. They took with them the Torah scrolls, which had been saved after having been thrown into the river, though they had grown moldy and illegible.

Ten years later, Zhao was detailed to restore the city. With the aid of his brother, Zhao Yingdou, he induced the Jews to recross the river and take up their old quarters. The temple was rebuilt in 1653, with the personal financial support of Zhao. One complete scroll of the Law was made up out of the fragments which had been saved from the river, and other copies were made from this. A stone stele dated 1663 was afterward erected, giving the details of Zhao Yingcheng's action.

Zhao wrote an account of the saving of the scrolls and the rebuilding of the temple, Record of the Vicissitudes of the Holy Scriptures. His brother wrote Preface to the Illustrious Way, believed to be an exposition of the tenets of Judaism. Both works are now lost, although in recent years Chinese scholars have begun a search for them in the libraries of Kaifeng, Beijing, and elsewhere.

All known descendants of Zhao are recorded to have perished from dysentery by the 17th century.

Notes

Sources
Li Yu, A History of Reading in Late Imperial China, 1000–1800, Ohio State University doctoral dissertation, 2003

Further reading
J. Tobar, Inscriptions Juives de K'ai-fong-fou. Shanghai, 1900
M. Adler, in Jewish Quarterly Review, xiii, 22–23
Donald Leslie, "The K’aifeng Jew Chao Ying-Ch’eng and his Family." In Studies of the Chinese Jews: Selections from Journals East and West, compiled by Hyman Kublin. New York: Paragon Book Reprint Corp., 1971
— The Survival of the Chinese Jews: The Jewish Community of Kaifeng. Leiden: E.J. Brill, 1972Mandarins, Jews, and Missionaries: The Jewish Experience in the Chinese Empire''. Philadelphia, 1980. Reprinted, 1983. 2nd ed., New York: 1998.

External links
"The Jews of Kaifeng" by Michael Pollack. The Sino-Judaic Institute

1619 births
1650s deaths
17th-century Chinese philosophers
Chinese Confucianists
Chinese Jews
History of Kaifeng
Jewish Chinese history
Jewish politicians
Jews and Judaism in Kaifeng
Ming dynasty philosophers
People from Kaifeng
Politicians from Kaifeng